Thomas Faulkner is a string theorist and professor at the University of Illinois, Urbana-Champaign, born in Melbourne, Australia. His undergraduate work was in physics at the University of Melbourne in Australia, from which he graduated in 2003.

His graduate work was in physics at the Massachusetts Institute of Technology. Faulkner obtained his Ph.D. in 2009. His thesis examined the use of string theory techniques to study quantum chromodynamics (QCD) under extreme conditions. He has held postdoctoral positions at the University of California, Santa-Barbara (2009-2012), and at the Institute for Advanced Study in Princeton, New Jersey (2012-2013), where he became interested in entanglement entropy and the role it plays in fundamental aspects of quantum gravity. He became an assistant professor of physics at the University of Illinois, Urbana-Champaign in 2014.

Selected publications
Faulkner's publications are available on the SPIRES HEP Literature Database.

External links
 
 Publications on ArXiv
 Faculty webpage

Year of birth missing (living people)
Living people
Scientists from Melbourne
Australian emigrants to the United States
MIT Department of Physics alumni
University of California, Santa Barbara faculty
Australian physicists
University of Illinois Urbana-Champaign faculty
String theorists
University of Melbourne alumni
People educated at Penleigh and Essendon Grammar School